Alfredo Ciucci (born 17 October 1920) was an Italian professional football player.

He played one game in the Serie A in the 1946/47 season for A.S. Roma.

1920 births
Possibly living people
Italian footballers
Serie A players
A.S. Roma players
Ternana Calcio players
Association football midfielders